The 1917 College Football All-America team consists of American football players selected to the College Football All-America Teams selected by various organizations in 1917. The selections were affected by the First World War. The Walter Camp Football Foundation lists no team in 1917. Camp posted an All-Service team in Collier's Weekly, and other organizations posted All-American teams. Walter Eckersall accidentally picked two players from Tech High School in an attempt to give credence to the first consensus national champion from the south, Georgia Tech. Walker Carpenter and Everett Strupper were the first two players from the Deep South ever selected All-American.

All-Americans of 1917

Ends

 Charles Bolen, Ohio State (MS; WE-1; JV-2; PP-1; DJ)
 Henry Miller, Penn (JV-1, DJ)
 Paul Robeson, Rutgers (WC–2; MS; JV-2; PP-2)
 Clifford Carlson, Pittsburgh (WE-1; JV-1)
 Ernest H. Von Heimburg, Navy  (PP-1)
 John Rasmussen, Nebraska; Grant (WC-1)
 William Jennings Gardner, Carlisle; Custer (WC-1)
 C. A. Coolidge, Harvard; Devens (PPS)
 Fred Heyman, Washington & Jefferson; Sherman (PPS)
 Ben Cubbage, Penn State; USAACS (NYT)
 George B. L. Green, Dartmouth; New Port Naval Res (NYT)
 Paul "Monk" Hager, West Virginia (PP-2)
 Elmer "Bird" Carroll, Washington & Jefferson (WE-2)
 Heinie Miller, Pennsylvania (WE-2)
 Ellenberger, Cornell; Dix (WC-2)
 Mitchell, Mare Isl.; Marines (WC-2)
 Spike Dennie, Brown; Funston (WC-3)
 Hunt, Coast Naval Res. (WC-3)

Tackles

 George Hauser, Minnesota (WE-1; JV-1; PP-1)
 Alfred Cobb, Syracuse (WE-2; JV-1; PP-1)
 Walker Carpenter, Georgia Tech (MS, DJ)
 Belford West, Colgate; Dix (College Football Hall of Fame) (WC-1, PPS)
 Pete Henry, Washington & Jefferson (MS)
 John Beckett, Oregon; Mare Isl. (College Football Hall of Fame) (WC-1)
 Albert Benbrook, Michigan; Ft. Sheridan (College Football Hall of Fame) (PPS)
 Pike Johnson, Washington & Lee; USAACS (NYT)
 Corbeau, Case; U. S. Marines Corps (NYT)
 Ernest Hubka, Nebraska (JV-2; PP-2)
 B. T. Williams, Oregon (JV-2; PP-2)
 Joseph Strauss, Penn (DJ)
 Joseph Murphy, Dartmouth (WE-2)
 Moriarty, Coast Naval Res. (WC-2)
 Hugh Blacklock, Mich. Ag; Great Lakes (WC-2)
 Robertson, Dartmouth; Dodge (WC-3)
 Zipper Lathrop, Notre Dame; Grant (WC-3)
 Harvey McCord, Tech High School (WE-1)

Guards
 Dale Seis, Pittsburgh (MS; PP-1, DJ)
 Eugene Neely, Dartmouth (JV-1)
 Jock Sutherland, Pittsburgh (JV-1)
 Clinton Black, Yale; Newport Res. (WC-1, PPS, NYT)
 Frank Culver, Michigan (JV-2; PP-1)
 Chris Schlachter, Syracuse; Newport Res. (PPS, NYT)
 C. J. Grabb, Brown (WE-1)
 H. M. Grey, Davidson (DJ)
 Ernest Allmendinger, Michigan; Ft. Sheridan (WC-1)
 Charles Lane, California (JV-2; PP-2)
 Herbert Dieter, Pennsylvania (PP-2)
 C. G. Higgins, Chicago (MS; WE-2)
 John Ulrich, Northwestern (WE-2)
 Allen Thurman, Virginia; Jackson (WC-2)
 Paul Withington, Harvard; Funston (WC-2)
 Snyder, 91st Division (WC-3)
 Holder, 91st Division (WC-3)
 Sid Sault, Tech High School (WE-1)

Centers
 Frank Rydzewski, Notre Dame (JV-1; PP-1)
 Russ Bailey, West Virginia (MS; WE-1; JV-2)
 Pup Phillips, Georgia Tech (DJ)
 John T. Callahan, Yale; Newport Res. (WC-1)
 Paul Des Jardien, Chicago; Ft. Sheridan (College Football Hall of Fame) (PPS)
 Lud Wray, Penn; U.S. Marine Corps (NYT)
 Alex Wray, Pennsylvania (PP-2)
 Oscar P. Lambert, Michigan (WE-2)
 Hommand, Kas.; Funston (WC-2)
 White, Yale; Jackson (WC-3)

Quarterbacks

 Benny Boynton, Williams (College Football Hall of Fame) (MS; JV-1)
 Bill Ingram, Navy (JV-2 [hb]; PP-2)
 Ockie Anderson, Colgate; Dix (WC-2; PPS)
 Archie Weston, Michigan (WE-1)
 Raymond "Razor" Watkins, Colgate; Mineola (WC-1)
 Charles Thorne "Mike" Murphy, Yale; USAACS (NYT)
 Albert Hill, Georgia Tech (JV-2)
 Brennan, Fordham (WE-2)
 Harry Costello, Georgetown; Custer (WC-3)

Halfbacks

 Elmer Oliphant, Army (College Football Hall of Fame) (MS; JV-1; PP-1, DJ)
 Everett Strupper, Georgia Tech (College Football Hall of Fame) (MS; JV-2; PP-1 [qb], DJ [qb])
 Charley Barrett, Cornell; Newport Res. (WC-2, PPS, NYT)
 Joe Guyon, Georgia Tech (College and Pro Football Hall of Fame) (PP-2, DJ)
 Eddie Casey, Harvard; Boston Navy Yard (College Football Hall of Fame) (WC-1)
 Wayland Minot, Harvard; Devens (WC-1)
 Bernard Gerrish, Dartmouth; Newport Res. (PPS)
 Johnny Scott, Lafayette; U.S. Marine Corps (NYT)
 "Scrubby" McCreight, Washington & Jefferson (PP-2)
 Arthur Hoffman, Cornell (WE-2)
 James J. Drummey, Tufts (WE-2)
 Fritz Shiverick, Cornell; Grant (WC-2)
 Edmund O'Boyle, Georgetown; Pelham (WC-3)
 Blair, Md.; Upton (WC-3)

Fullbacks

 Chic Harley, Ohio State (College Football Hall of Fame) (WE-1; JV-1; PP-1; DJ)
 George "Tank" McLaren, Pittsburgh (College Football Hall of Fame) (MS; WE-1 [HB]; JV-1; PP-2)
 Joseph Howard Berry, Jr., Pennsylvania (WE-1; JV-2; PP-1)
 Cedric C. Smith, Michigan; Great Lakes (WC-1)
 Eddie Mahan, Harvard; U.S. Marine Corps (College Football Hall of Fame) (PPS)
 Earl "Curley" Cramer, Hamline; USAACS (NYT)
 Bob Koehler, Northwestern (WE-2)
 Maxfield, Lafayette, Ft. Slocum (WC-2)
 Thayer, Pa.; Meade (WC-3)

Key
NCAA recognized selectors for 1917
 WC = Collier's Weekly All Service team as selected by Walter Camp
 JV = Jack Veiock of the International News Service
 PP = Paul Purman, noted sports writer whose All-American team was syndicated in newspapers across the United States, of the Newspaper Editors Association
 PPS = Paul Purman's All Service selection
 MS = Frank Menke Syndicate, by Frank G. Menke

Other selectors
 WE = Walter Eckersall, of the Chicago Tribune 
 DJ = Dick Jemison, of the Atlanta Constitution.
 NYT = All Service eleven of The New York Times.

Bold = Consensus All-American
 1 – First-team selection
 2 – Second-team selection
 3 – Third-team selection

See also
 1917 All-Big Ten Conference football team
 1917 All-Southern college football team
 1917 All-Western college football team

References

All-America Team
College Football All-America Teams